Todd is an unincorporated community in Huntingdon County, Pennsylvania, United States. Todd had a post office until September 28, 2002; it still has its own ZIP code, 16685.

References

Unincorporated communities in Huntingdon County, Pennsylvania
Unincorporated communities in Pennsylvania